The following is a list of the monastic houses in East Sussex, England.

See also
 List of monastic houses in England

Notes

References

East Sussex
Lists of buildings and structures in East Sussex
East Sussex